Wild Is the Wind (2022) is a South African crime drama film directed by Fabian Medea. It depicts the corruption and racism in the South African judicial system through the investigation of the murder of an Afrikaner girl by two corrupt policemen played by Mothusi Magano and Frank Rautenbach. 

The film is a co-production between Netflix and Known Associates Entertainment, a South African production company.

Cast 

 Mothusi Magano as Vusi Matsoso 
 Frank Rautenbach as John Smit 
 Chris Chameleon as Wilhelm 
 Mona Monyane as Abigail Matsoso 
 Nicolus Moitoi as Sonnyboy 
 Izel Bezuidenhout as Melissa 
 Phoenix Baaitse as Slick 
 Deon Coetzee as Martin Van Der Walt

Release and reception 
It was released on Netflix in October 2022  and ranked in the streamer's Global Top 10 within the first week of its release. As of 7 November 2022, it scored 63% on Rotten Tomatoes.

Reference

External links
 
 

English-language Netflix original films
South African crime drama films
2022 films